Associação Nova Prata de Esportes Cultura e Lazer, commonly known as Associação Nova Prata, or just as Nova Prata, is a Brazilian football club based in Nova Prata, Rio Grande do Sul state.

History
The club was founded on April 10, 2003. The club won the Campeonato Municipal de Nova Prata in 2008. In 2009 and 2010 they participated in the Campeonato Estadual Amador. They competed in the 2011 edition of the Copa FGF. Nova Prata competed in the Campeonato Gaúcho Third Division in 2012.

Achievements
 Campeonato Municipal de Nova Prata:
 Winners (1): 2008

Stadium
Associação Nova Prata de Esportes Cultura e Lazer play their home games at Estádio Municipal Dr. Mário Cini. The stadium has a maximum capacity of 6,000 people.

References

Association football clubs established in 2003
Football clubs in Rio Grande do Sul
2003 establishments in Brazil